Edwin Van Wyck "Ed" Zschau (born January 6, 1940) is an American educator who represented California's 12th District in the United States House of Representatives from 1983 to 1987.  In 1986 he ran as the Republican candidate for a seat in the United States Senate. He prevailed in a crowded Republican primary that included, among others, conservative commentator Bruce Herschensohn, Los Angeles County supervisor Michael D. Antonovich and Congresswoman Bobbi Fiedler, but then lost to incumbent Democrat Alan Cranston by a narrow margin.

Zschau briefly re-entered the political arena as the vice presidential running mate to former Colorado Governor Dick Lamm, a Democrat, who challenged Ross Perot for the Reform Party presidential nomination in 1996.

On May 26, 2019, Dr. Zschau became the Interim President of Sierra Nevada College, a role he held until the appointment of his successor the following year.

Biography

Zschau was born in Omaha, Nebraska and was a figure skating champion in his teenage years.

Zschau graduated cum laude with an A.B. in philosophy from Princeton University in 1961 after completing a senior thesis titled "Space Time and Geometry from Kant to Einstein." He also holds M.B.A., M.S. (statistics), and Ph.D. degrees from Stanford University.

During the 1960s, Zschau was for five years an assistant professor at the Stanford Graduate School of Business, teaching courses in computer systems, management science, and business policy. In 1967–68 he was a visiting assistant professor at the Harvard Business School, where he taught the required first year MBA course in managerial economics.

In 1968 Zschau founded a computer company, System Industries. One of his collaborators in founding this company was Henry B. Eyring. Zschau served as CEO of System Industries from 1968 to 1981.

In 1987 Zschau became a general partner of Brentwood Associates, a Los Angeles-based venture capital firm, and in 1988, he was elected chairman and CEO of Censtor Corp., a company which had been founded by Brentwood to develop advanced magnetic recording components for disk drives. He was recruited to be chairman and CEO of Adstar, the IBM Storage Systems Division, in 1993.

Zschau is also the founding chairman, emeritus, and a member of the National Advisory Board of The Tech Museum of Innovation in San Jose, is on the board of scholars of the ACCF Center for Policy Research in Washington, D.C., and is a fellow of the California Council on Science and Technology. He serves as chairman of the board of NanoOpto Corporation, Princeton Power Systems, and StarTek, Inc. (NYSE), President of Polyera Corporation, as a director of The Reader's Digest Association, Inc. (NYSE), and Washington Live, Inc.

Zschau is currently a visiting lecturer with rank of professor at Princeton University in the Departments of Electrical Engineering, Operations Research and Financial Engineering, and in the Keller Center for Innovation in Engineering Education. Prior to his current post at Princeton, from 1997 to 2000, he was professor of management at the Harvard Business School and a visiting professor at Princeton University. During his years at Princeton, Zschau was a professor and mentor to Tim Ferriss. In the summer of 2019, Zschau accepted a pro bono position as Interim President of Sierra Nevada University, in Incline Village, Nevada.

Personal life 
Zschau and his wife, Jo, currently reside in Nantucket, Massachusetts, and Los Altos, California. They have one son and two daughters.

Zschau is skilled in playing the ukulele and was known to some as the "singing congressman".

References

External links

 

1940 births
Living people
IBM employees
Politicians from Omaha, Nebraska
Princeton University faculty
Harvard Business School faculty
Stanford University Graduate School of Business faculty
Stanford University alumni
Reform Party of the United States of America politicians
Republican Party members of the United States House of Representatives from California
Businesspeople from Omaha, Nebraska